Qaleh-ye Kohneh or Qaleh Kohneh may refer to various places in Iran:
 Qaleh Kohneh, Bushehr
 Qaleh-ye Kohneh, Khorrambid, Fars Province
 Qaleh Kohneh, Mamasani, Fars Province
 Qaleh Kohneh, Kermanshah
 Qaleh Kohneh, Kani Shirin, Divandarreh County, Kurdistan Province
 Qaleh Kohneh, Obatu, Divandarreh County, Kurdistan Province
 Qaleh Kohneh, Saqqez, Kurdistan Province
 Qaleh-ye Kohneh, Sistan and Baluchestan

See also
 Kohneh Qaleh (disambiguation)